Ruginoasa may refer to several places:

 Ruginoasa, a commune in Iași County, Romania
 Ruginoasa, a commune in Neamț County, Romania
 Ruginoasa, a village in Valea Iașului Commune, Argeș County, Romania
 Ruginoasa, a village in Brăeşti Commune, Buzău County, Romania
 Ruginoasa, a village in Cuzăplac Commune, Sălaj County, Romania